East Branch Field Brook is a tributary of Field Brook in Susquehanna County and Wyoming County, in Pennsylvania, in the United States. The stream is not designated as an impaired waterbody. It is a Coldwater Fishery and a Migratory Fishery.

Course
East Branch Field Brook begins in an unnamed lake in Lathrop Township, Susquehanna County. It flows east-southeast for a few tenths of a mile before turning south-southeast for more than a mile as its valley becomes narrower. In this reach, it receives an unnamed tributary from the left and passes by Miller Hill. The stream then turns south for several tenths of a mile before turning south-southeast again. After a short distance, it exits Lathrop Township and Susquehanna County.

Upon exiting Susquehanna County, Eats Branch Field Brook continues flowing south-southeast. Its valley becomes shallower and several tenths of a mile further downstream, it reaches its confluence with Field Brook.

Hydrology
East Branch Field Brook is not classified as an impaired waterbody.

An Erosion and Sediment Control permit has been issued to Williams Field Services Company, LLC, for which one of the receiving streams is East Branch Field Brook. Chief Gathering, LLC once requested a permit to construct and maintain a  pipeline for natural gas and a two timber mat bridges across the stream. One crossing would impact  of the stream and the other would impact .

Geography and geology

The surficial geology along the lower and middle reaches of East Branch Field Brook mainly consists of alluvium, while the rest of the stream's valley has surficial geology consisting of a till known as Wisconsinan Till. However, near the mouth of the stream, there is a patch of alluvial terrace. In the stream's upper reaches, the surficial geology mostly consists of Wisconsinan Till and a lake.

Watershed and biology
The stream is entirely within the United States Geological Survey quadrangle of Hop Bottom. The stream's mouth is within a mile (two kilometers) of Nicholson.

The designated use of East Branch Field Brook is aquatic life. The stream is classified as a Coldwater Fishery and a Migratory Fishery.

History
East Branch Field Brook was entered into the Geographic Names Information System on August 2, 1979. Its identifier in the Geographic Names Information System is 1173743.

A bridge carrying State Route 2002 crosses East Branch Field Brook in Lathrop Township, Susquehanna County. A 1996 act authorized the rehabilitation of the bridge.

See also
List of rivers of Pennsylvania

References

Rivers of Susquehanna County, Pennsylvania
Rivers of Wyoming County, Pennsylvania
Tributaries of Tunkhannock Creek
Rivers of Pennsylvania